Pyridine alkaloids are a class of alkaloids, nitrogen-containing chemical compounds widely found in plants, that contain a pyridine ring.  Examples include nicotine and anabasine which are found in plants of the genus Nicotiana including tobacco.

Alkaloids with a pyridine partial structure are usually further subdivided according to their occurrence and their biogenetic origin. The most important examples of pyridine alkaloids are the nicotine and anabasine, which are found in tobacco, the areca alkaloids in betel and ricinine in castor oil.

References

External links